Vardzelashvili is a Georgian surname ვარძელაშვილი. Notable people with the surname include:

Besarion Vardzelashvili
Konstantine Vardzelashvili (born 1972), Georgian jurist
Vladimir Vardzelashvili (born 1979), Georgian politician

Georgian-language surnames